Atlanta Reign is an American professional Overwatch esports team based in Atlanta, Georgia. The Reign compete in the Overwatch League (OWL) as a member of the league's West region. Founded in 2018, Atlanta Reign began play as one of eight OWL expansion teams in 2019 and became the first esports team to officially represent the city of Atlanta. The team is owned by Atlanta Esports Ventures, a joint venture between Cox Enterprises and Province, Inc., who also own ATL Academy, a former academy team for the Reign that competed in Overwatch Contenders.

The Reign have been coached by Brad "Sephy" Rajani since their inaugural season. Atlanta have reached the season playoffs in every season and reached the Grand Finals in 2021, where they lost to the Shanghai Dragons.

Franchise history 
On August 2, 2018, it was announced that Atlanta Esports Ventures, a partnership between Cox Enterprises and Province, Inc, purchased one of Activision Blizzard's expansion slots in the Overwatch League at an estimated $30 million to $60 million. Activision Blizzard was expecting to sell Atlanta one of the expansion slots, as president and CEO of Activision Blizzard Esports Leagues Pete Vlastlica noted, "We always had our eye on [Atlanta], from the beginning. It [was] just a matter of when." With the purchase, the franchise became the first esports team to officially represent the city of Atlanta.

Atlanta hired of former San Francisco Shock head coach Brad "Sephy" Rajani as their head coach. In late October 2018, the Reign announced their full roster, consisting of eight players. It did not include any player that had previously competed in the Overwatch League; instead, the team signed players from various Overwatch Contenders scenes, including damage player Jeong "Erster" Jun, tank players Blake "Gator" Scott and Park "Pokpo" Hyeon-jun, and support player and Petja "Masaa" Kantanen. The team later signed support Dusttin "Dogman" Bowerman, as well as controversial streamer Daniel "Dafran" Francesca.

Early years: 2019–present 
The Reign's first ever regular season OWL match resulted in a 4–0 victory over Florida Mayhem on February 15, 2019. Atlanta finished Stage 1 with a 4–3 record and secured a spot in the Stage 1 playoffs. However, the team lost to the Philadelphia Fusion in the quarterfinals. On March 28, prior to the beginning of Stage 2, Dafran retired. The Reign picked up multiple players afterwards, including damage player Andrej "Babybay" Francisty, who was acquired from the San Francisco Shock. The Reign struggled throughout Stages 2 and 3, posting a combined 5–9 record and no stage playoff appearances. The team hit their stride in Stage 4, when the league implemented a 2-2-2 role lock, winning all seven of their matches in the stage. With a 16–12 record for the season, the Reign claimed the sixth seed in the season playoffs, a double-elimination tournament. Atlanta's first playoff match resulted with a 4–3 upset over the Shock on September 6. However, the team fell 2–4 to the New York Excelsior the following match, sending them to the lower bracket. A 0–4 loss to the Hangzhou Spark in the following match ended the Reign's playoff run.

Prior to the start of the 2020 season, the Reign parted ways with three of their players. The team signed fived players, including tank Xander "Hawk" Domecq and damage player Kim "Edison" Tae-Hoon, maxing out their roster for a total of twelve. The Reign found middling results throughout the season; in all three midseason tournament cycles, Atlanta advanced past the knockouts, only to fall in the quarterfinals each time. Additionally, in July, the team saw the retirement of Babybay, as well as the signing of support player Kim "Ir1s" Seung-Hyun. Atlanta finished the regular season in 12th place, with a 10–11 record. The Reign advanced to the North America play-in tournament, where they defeated the Boston Uprising, 3–1, to advance to the season playoffs. Atlanta's first match in the North America bracket was a 3–2 win over the Paris Eternal on September 6. However, the team fell to the Shock, 1–3, in the following round, dropping Atlanta to the lower bracket. The Reign were eliminated from the playoff on September 11, following a 0–3 loss to the Florida Mayhem.

After a season filled with players being substituted in and out, the Reign elected to drop a majority of their roster, keeping only Edison, Gator, Hawk, Masaa, and Ir1s. The team picked up two damage players: touted rookie prospect Oh "Pelican" Se-hyun and hitscan veteran Kai "Kai" Collins. The Reign failed to advance the regional knockouts in the first tournament cycle of the 2021 season, the May Melee, after going 1–3 in the qualifiers. The team found success in the following tournament cycle, the June Joust, advancing past the regional qualifiers to the interregional tournament. However, the team lost in the lower bracket finals to the Shanghai Dragons by a score of 0–3. Atlanta found similar results in the Summer Showdown, as they once again reached the interregional tournament but ultimately fell in the first round of the lower bracket after a 2–3 loss to the Dallas Fuel. In the final tournament cycle, the Countdown Cup, the Reign qualified for their third consecutive tournament appearance. However, Reign Pelican suffered a collapsed lung prior to the tournament, and Atlanta were eventually eliminated by the Hunters. The team finished the regular season with a 11–5 record and the fifth seed in the season playoffs. Pelican won the league's Rookie of the Year award. In the first round of the playoffs, the Reign fell to the third-seeded Hunters, 2–3, sending them to the lower bracket of the tournament. Atlanta ran through the lower bracket, defeating the eighth-seeded Washington Justice, 3–0, the fourth-seeded Los Angeles Gladiators, 3–2, the sixth-seeded San Francisco Shock, 3–1, and the second-seeded Dallas Fuel, 3–1. The Reign advanced to the 2021 Overwatch League Grand Finals, where they faced the top-seeded Shanghai Dragons. The Grand Finals match was a blowout, as Atlanta was swept, 0–4.

In the offseason preceding the 2022 season, the Reign parted ways with four of their players, including Pelican, who was transferred to the Houston Outlaws. The team retained Gator, Hawk, and Kai, picked rookies Lee "Venom" Dong-keun, Christian "Ojee" Han, and Benjamin "UltraViolet" David, and signed damage veteran Charlie "nero" Zwarg.

Team identity 
On October 23, 2018, Atlanta Esports Ventures announced that the team Atlanta-based team would be called the Atlanta Reign. "We are excited to finally unveil the Atlanta Reign," said President and chief executive officer of Atlanta Esports Ventures Paul Hamilton, "We said from the beginning that we are building to compete. We chose a name that reflects that intention. We want to engage directly with Atlanta's passionate esports community and the city as a whole."

The logo depicts a red phoenix inside a crest, with the rising phoenix representing Atlanta's city seal and new beginnings, as well as the team's name, representing "work ethic, reinvention, and excellence," especially that of the city of Atlanta. The official colors of the team are red, light gray, and charcoal gray.

Personnel

Current roster

Head coaches

Awards and records

Seasons overview

Individual accomplishments 
Rookie of the Year
Pelican (Oh Se-hyun) – 2021

All-Star Game selections
Dogman (Dusttin Bowerman) – 2019, 2020

Academy team 
In November 2018, the Atlanta Reign announced that unsponsored Overwatch Contenders team Last Night's Leftovers would be competing as Atlanta's academy team in Overwatch Contenders. The team rebranded to ATL Academy and began play as an affiliate team in the North America region of Contenders in Season 3 of 2018. In March 2020, after just over a year of play, ATL Academy withdrew from Contenders and went on an indefinite hiatus.

References

External links 

 

 
2018 establishments in Georgia (U.S. state)
Esports teams based in the United States
Overwatch League teams
Esports teams established in 2018
Sports teams in Atlanta
Venture capital-funded esports teams